ZBVI 780 is an A.M. radio station broadcasting from Tortola, British Virgin Islands. Listed in the F.C.C. database with the callsign of ZBV, the station calls itself ZBVI on-air. Although the station is located in the British Virgin Islands the broadcast reach extends to Anguilla, the United States Virgin Islands and Puerto Rico's islands Culebra and Vieques. In 1971 the United States banned cigarette radio advertising resulting in ZBVI having a category of niche advertising clients.

References

External links

Radio stations in the British Virgin Islands